The following radio stations broadcast on AM frequency 1270 kHz: 1270 AM is a Regional broadcast frequency.

In Argentina
 LRA20 in Las Lomitas
 LS11 Provincia in La Plata, Buenos Aires

In Canada
 CJCB in Sydney, Nova Scotia - 10 kW, transmitter located at

In Mexico
 XEAZ-AM in Tijuana, Baja California
 XEGL-AM in Navojoa, Sonora
 XETGME-AM in Gómez Palacio, Durango

In Norway
 AOR-AM in Longyearbyen, Svalbard

In the United States

References

Lists of radio stations by frequency